Cynea is a genus of skippers in the family Hesperiidae.

Species
Recognised species in the genus Cynea include:
 Cynea cannae (Herrich-Schaffer, 1869)
 Cynea corisana (Plötz, 1882)
 Cynea cynea (Hewitson, 1876)
 Cynea cyrus (Plötz, 1883)
 Cynea diluta (Herrich-Schäffer, 1869)
 Cynea hycsos (Mabille, 1891)
 Cynea iquita (Bell, 1941)
 Cynea irma (Möschler, 1878)
 Cynea melius (Geyer, 1832)
 Cynea robba Evans, [1955]

Former species
Cynea osembo (Stoll, 1782) - synonymized to Cymaenes diluta (Herrich-Schäffer, 1869)

References 

Natural History Museum Lepidoptera genus database

Hesperiini
Hesperiidae genera